The Akosombo Dam, also known as the Volta Dam, is a hydroelectric dam on the Volta River in southeastern Ghana in the Akosombo gorge and part of the Volta River Authority. The construction of the dam flooded part of the Volta River Basin and led to the subsequent creation of Lake Volta. Lake Volta is the largest man-made lake in the world by surface area. With a volume of 148 cubic kilometers, Lake Volta is the world's third largest man-made lake by volume; the largest being Lake Kariba which contains 185 cubic kilometers of water.

The primary purpose of the Akosombo Dam was to provide electricity for the aluminium industry. The Akosombo Dam was called "the largest single investment in the economic development plans of Ghana." The dam is significant for providing the majority of both Togo and Benin's electricity, although the construction of the Adjarala Dam (on Togo's Mono River) hopes to reduce these countries' reliance on imported electricity.

The flooding that created the Lake Volta reservoir displaced many people and had a significant impact on the local environment, including seismic activity that led to coastal erosion; a changed hydrology caused microclimatic changes with less rain and higher temperatures. The soil surrounding the lake is less fertile than the soil under it, and heavy agricultural use has required the use of fertilizers, which in turn has led to eutrophication, which caused, among others, the explosive growth of an invasive weed that renders water navigation and transportation difficult, and form a habitat for the vectors of water-borne illnesses such as bilharzia, river blindness and malaria. Resettlement of the displaced inhabitants proved complex and in some cases unsuccessful; traditional farming practices disappeared and poverty increased.

Design 
The dam was conceived in 1915 by geologist Albert Kitson, but no plans were drawn until the 1940s. The development of the Volta River Basin was proposed in 1949, but because funds were insufficient, the American company Volta Aluminum Company (Valco) lent money to Ghana so that the dam could be constructed. President Kwame Nkrumah adopted the Volta River hydropower project. 

Each spillway contains six -wide and -tall steel floodgates.

The dam's power plant contains six  Francis turbines.

The final proposal outlined the building of an aluminum smelter at Tema, a dam constructed at Akosombo to power the smelter, and a network of power lines installed through southern Ghana.  The aluminum smelter was expected to eventually provide the revenue necessary for establishing local bauxite mining and refining, which would allow aluminum production without importing foreign alumina.  Development of the aluminum industry within Ghana was dependent upon the proposed hydroelectric power. The proposed project's aluminum smelter was overseen by the American company Kaiser Aluminum and is operated by Valco. The smelter received its financial investment from Valco shareholders, with the support of the Export-Import Bank of the United States. However, Valco did not invest without first requiring insurances from Ghana's government, such as company exemptions from taxes on trade and discounted purchases of electricity. The estimated total cost of the project was $258 million.

Construction 

In May 1960, the Ghana government called for tenders for construction of the hydroelectric dam. In 1961, an Italian consortium, Impregilo which had just completed the Kariba Dam, won the contract. In 1961, the Volta River Authority (VRA) was established by Ghana's Parliament through the passage of the Volta River Development Act. The VRA's fundamental operations were structured by six Board members and Nkrumah as chairman. The VRA's primary task is to manage the development of the Volta River Basin, which included the construction and supervision of the dam, the power station and the power transmission network. The VRA is responsible for the reservoir impounded by the dam, fishing within the lake, lake transportation and communication, and the welfare of those surrounding the lake.

The dam was built between 1961 and 1965. Its development was undertaken by the Ghanaian government and funded 25% by the International Bank for Reconstruction and Development of the World Bank, the United States, and the United Kingdom. Impreglio carried out the dredging of the river bed and dewatering of the channel, and completed the dam a month earlier than scheduled despite flooding of the Volta River in 1963 which delayed work over three months. Between 1961 and 1966, 28 workers of Impregilo died during the construction of the dam. Memorials in Akosombo township and St. Barbara Catholic Church have been put up in their honor.

The construction of the Akosombo Dam resulted in the flooding of part of the Volta River Basin and its upstream fields, and in the creation of Lake Volta which covers 3.6% of Ghana's total land area. Lake Volta was formed between 1962 and 1966 and necessitated the relocation of about 80,000 people, who represented 1% of the population. People of 700 villages were relocated into 52 resettlement villages two years prior to the dam's completion; the resettlement program was under the direction of the VRA. Two percent of the resettlement population were riparian fishers, and most were subsistence farmers. The Eastern Region of Ghana and the populations incorporated within its districts were most subject to the project's effects.

Power generation 
The dam provides electricity to Ghana and its neighboring West African countries, including Togo and Benin. Initially 20% of Akosombo Dam's electric output (serving 70% of national demand) was provided to Ghanaians in the form of electricity, the remaining 80% was generated for Valco. The Ghana government was compelled, by contract, to pay for over 50% of the cost of Akosombo's construction, but the country was allowed only 20% of the power generated. Some commentators are concerned that this is an example of neocolonialism. In recent years the production from the Valco plant has declined with the vast majority of additional capacity in Akosombo used to service growing domestic demand.

Initially, the dam's power production capabilities greatly overreached the actual demand; while, the demand since the dam's inception has resulted in the doubling of hydropower production. Ghana's industrial and economic expansion triggered a higher demand for power, beyond the Akosombo's power plant capabilities. By 1981, a smaller dam was built at Kpong, downstream from Akosombo, and further upgrades to Akosombo have become necessary for maintaining hydropower output. 

Increasing demands for power exceed what can be provided by the current infrastructure. Power demands, along with unforeseen environmental trends, have resulted in rolling blackouts and major power outages. An overall trend of lower lake levels has been observed, sometimes below the requirement for operation of the dam.

In the beginning of 2007, concerns were expressed over the electricity supply from the dam because of low water levels in the Lake Volta reservoir. During the latter half of 2007, much of this concern was abated when heavy rain fell in the catchment area of Volta River. In 2010, the highest-ever water level was recorded at the dam.

Impacts 

The Akosombo Dam benefited some industrial and economic activities from the addition of lake transportation, increased fishing, new farming activities along the shoreline, and tourism.

Biological habitat 

In the time following the construction of the dam, there has been a steady decline in agricultural productivity along the lake and the associated tributaries. The land surrounding Lake Volta is not nearly as fertile as the formerly cultivated land residing underneath the lake, and heavy agricultural activity has since exhausted the already inadequate soils.  Downstream agricultural systems are losing soil fertility without the periodic floods that brought nutrients to the soil before the natural river flow was halted by the dam. The growth of commercially intensive agriculture has produced a rise in fertilizer run-off into the river. This, along with run-off from nearby cattle stocks and sewage pollution, has caused eutrophication of the river waters. The nutrient enrichment, in combination with the low water movement, has allowed for the invasion of aquatic weeds (Ceratophyllum). These weeds have become a formidable challenge to water navigation and transportation.

Human welfare 
The presence of aquatic weed along the lake and within the tributaries has resulted in even greater detriment to local human health. The weeds provide the necessary habitat for black-fly, mosquitoes and snails, which are the vectors of water-borne illnesses such as bilharzia, river blindness and malaria. Since the installation of the dam, these diseases have increased remarkably.  In particular, resettlement villages have shown an increase in disease prevalence since the establishment of Lake Volta, and a village's likelihood of infection corresponds to its proximity to the lake. Children and fishermen have been especially hard hit by this rise of disease prevalence. Additionally, the degradation of aquatic habitat has resulted in the decline of shrimp and clam populations. The physical health of local communities has been diminished from this loss of shellfish populations, as they provided an essential source of dietary protein. Likewise, the rural and industrial economies have experienced the financial losses associated with the decimation of river aquaculture.

Increased human migration within the area has been driven by poverty and unfavorable resettlement conditions. This migration enabled the contraction of HIV and has since led to its heightened prevalence within Volta Basin communities. The districts of Manya Krobo and Yilo Krobo, which lie within the southwest portion of the Volta Basin, are predominantly indigenous communities that have attained a disproportionate prevalence of HIV. The situation underlines the strength of the local factors upon these districts.  Commercial sex work was established in response to the thousands of male workers that were in the area for building the dam. Ten percent of the child-bearing females from these two districts migrated out of their districts during this time. In 1986, "90% of AIDS victims in Ghana were women, and 96% of them had recently lived outside the country".

Socioeconomics 
The loss of land experienced by the 80,000 people forcibly relocated meant the loss of their primary economic activities from fishing and agriculture, loss of their homes, loss of their family grave sites, loss of community stability, and the eventual loss of important social values. The resettlement program demonstrated the social complexities involved in establishing "socially cohesive and integrated" communities. Insufficient planning resulted in the relocation of communities into areas that were not capable of providing for their former livelihoods and traditions. The loss of the naturally fertile soils beneath Lake Volta essentially led to the loss of traditional farming practices. The poor living conditions provided within the resettlement villages has been demonstrated by population reductions since resettlement.  One resettlement village in particular experienced a greater than 50% population reduction in the 23 years following relocation. Increased economic risks and experiences of poverty are associated with those communities most impacted by the Volta River's development. The extensive human migration and degradation of natural resources within the Volta-basin area, are the products of poverty in conjunction with population pressure.

Physical environment 
Reservoir-induced seismicity has been recorded because of the crustal re-adjustments from the added weight of the water within Lake Volta. There is an eastward shift of the river's mouth from the changes to the river's delta, and this has led to continuing coastal erosion. The changes in the river hydrology have altered the local heat budget which has caused microclimatic changes such as decreasing rain and higher mean monthly temperatures. All of these larger scale environmental impacts will all further compound the problems surrounding disruptions to local economic activities and associated, difficult human welfare conditions. A case study by the International Federation of Surveyors has indicated that the dam has had a significant impact on the shoreline erosion of the barrier separating the Keta Lagoon from the sea. Dr. Isaac Boateng has calculated the reduction of fluvial sediment as being from 71 million cubic metres per year to as little as 7 million cubic metres per year.

See also 

Adomi Bridge
Bui Dam

Notes

References

External links 

 Video documentary on the history of the dam. Published by the Volta River Authority (2013)
 Ghana Web – History of The Dam
 Volta River Project economics
 University of Ghana
 History of Akosombo dam
 VRA honours Italy, contractors of Akosombo, Kpong dams

Dams in Ghana
Lake Volta
Dams on the Volta River
Volta River Authority
Dams completed in 1965
1965 establishments in Ghana
Eastern Region (Ghana)